José Oscar Herrera Corominas (born 17 June 1965 in Tala) is a Uruguayan former international footballer who played as a defender for various clubs.

Club career
Herrera started his playing career with Peñarol where he was part of two championship winning squads in (1985 & 1986) and a winner of the Copa Libertadores in 1987.

In 1989, he joined Figueres of Spain, and in 1990 he joined Cagliari in Italy where he played over 100 games for the club.

In 1995, he joined Atalanta and in 1996 he moved to Mexico to play for Cruz Azul. In 1997, he played for Newell's Old Boys of Argentina.

Herrera returned to Uruguay later in his career where he played for Peñarol, Racing Club de Montevideo and Montevideo Wanderers.

International career
At international level, Herrera played for the Uruguay national team on 57 occasions between 1988 and 1997, scoring four goals. He was part of the squad that won the Copa América in 1995.

Personal life
Herrera's daughter, Sofia, married Uruguayan international Diego Godín.

Honours

Club
 Peñarol
Uruguayan Primera: 1985, 1986
Copa Libertadores: 1987

International
 Uruguay
Copa América: 1995

External links

 profile at Tenfield

References

1965 births
Living people
People from Canelones Department
Uruguayan footballers
Uruguay international footballers
Association football defenders
Uruguayan Primera División players
Argentine Primera División players
Serie A players
Peñarol players
UE Figueres footballers
Cagliari Calcio players
Atalanta B.C. players
Cruz Azul footballers
Shandong Taishan F.C. players
Newell's Old Boys footballers
Racing Club de Montevideo players
Montevideo Wanderers F.C. players
1990 FIFA World Cup players
1993 Copa América players
1995 Copa América players
Uruguayan expatriate footballers
Expatriate footballers in Italy
Uruguayan expatriate sportspeople in Italy
Expatriate footballers in Mexico
Uruguayan expatriate sportspeople in China
Expatriate footballers in Argentina
Uruguayan expatriate sportspeople in Mexico
Expatriate footballers in China
Uruguayan expatriate sportspeople in Argentina
Persib Bandung players
Expatriate footballers in Indonesia
Copa América-winning players
Segunda División players